Linzhou may refer to:

 Linzhou, Henan (林州), a county-level city in Henan, China
 Linzhou Steel, a state-owned Chinese steel company
 Lhünzhub County in Tibet, China, known in Chinese as Linzhou (林周)
 Linzhou (林州), a former prefecture in roughly modern Guiping County, Guangxi, China
 Linzhou (林州), a former prefecture in roughly modern Huachi County, Gansu, China
 Linzhou (潾州), a former prefecture in roughly modern Dazhu County (or perhaps Lingshui County), Sichuan, China